Thống Nhất is a rural district of Đồng Nai province in the Southeast region of Vietnam. As of 2003, the district had a population of 146,112. The district covers an area of 247 km². The district capital lies at Dầu Giây.

Administrative divisions
Thống Nhất is divided into one township, Dầu Giây, and ten communes: Bàu Hàm 2, Gia Kiệm, Gia Tân 1, Gia Tân 2, Gia Tân 3, Hưng Lộc, Lộ 25, Quang Trung, Xuân Thạnh and Xuân Thiện.

References

Districts of Đồng Nai province